What's Cooking? is a British lifestyle show that aired on Channel 4 from 25 February to 24 May 2013. It was hosted by Ben Shephard and Lisa Faulkner.

References

2013 British television series debuts
2013 British television series endings
British cooking television shows
Channel 4 original programming
English-language television shows